The Pârâul de Câmpie is a right tributary of the river Mureș in Transylvania, Romania. It discharges into the Mureș in Luduș.

Tributaries
The following rivers are tributaries to the river Pârâul de Câmpie (from source to mouth):

Left: Ciciana Mare, Șes, Valea Sarchii
Right: Valea Morii, Corabia, Fundătura

References

Rivers of Romania
Rivers of Mureș County